Trouble in Paradise is an Australian television documentary series on the Nine Network which first aired at  on Thursday, 25 June 2009. The series is narrated by journalist Liam Bartlett and actress Brooke Satchwell, and chronicles the harrowing experiences of Australians travelling on their holidays.

Trouble in Paradise features six edited stories from a similar British series, My Holiday Hostage Hell (which is broadcast in Australia on the Crime & Investigation Network), and six originally-produced stories. Each episode consists of two stories, and six episodes have been produced.

The show was axed from the Nine Network's schedule after three of the six episodes had aired. It was eventually returned to the schedule of the Nine Network's digital multichannel, GEM, which broadcast the remaining three episodes commencing 16 March 2011.

Episodes

Notes

References

2000s Australian documentary television series
Nine Network original programming
2009 Australian television series debuts
2011 Australian television series endings
2010s Australian documentary television series